Artūrs Otomārs Motmillers (1 October 1900 – 18 August 1980) was a Latvian long-distance runner. He competed at the 1924, 1928 and the 1936 Summer Olympics. 

Motmillers was the winner of the 12th Košice Peace Marathon in 1935, the 1937 Quer durch Berlin race and an eight-time Latvian champion in various lengths. He also broke the national record 13 times, with his marathon time set in 1933 (2.41:38,2) remaining unbeaten for 19 years.

During World War II he gave refuge to seven persecuted Jews. After the war he was deported to the Russian SFSR by the Soviet regime, but later returned to Latvia. He died in 1980.

References

External links
 

1900 births
1980 deaths
Athletes (track and field) at the 1924 Summer Olympics
Athletes (track and field) at the 1928 Summer Olympics
Athletes (track and field) at the 1936 Summer Olympics
Latvian male long-distance runners
Latvian male marathon runners
Olympic athletes of Latvia
Athletes from Riga